Alper Emre Demirol (born 1 October 2002) is a Swedish professional footballer who plays as a central midfielder for Hammarby IF in Allsvenskan.

Early life
Born and raised in Stockholm, Demirol played youth football with Hammarby IF, Djurgårdens IF and IF Brommapojkarna. In 2021, he was part of Hammarby's U19 squad that finished second in the Swedish championship, after a 2–1 loss to IFK Göteborg in the national final.

Club career

Hammarby IF
On 26 February 2022, Demirol made his competitive debut for Hammarby's senior team, in a 6–1 away in against Ytterhogdals IK in Svenska Cupen, the main domestic cup. On 22 July the same year, after making three substitute appearances in Allsvenskan, Demirol signed a two and a half year-contract with Hammarby running until the end of 2024.

International career
In November 2022, Demirol was called up to the Swedish under-21's for the first time, ahead of two friendlies against Denmark and Azerbaijan, and went on to appear in both matches.

Career statistics

Club

Notes

References

External links
 
 

2002 births
Living people
Footballers from Stockholm
Swedish footballers
Swedish people of Turkish descent
Association football midfielders
Ettan Fotboll players
Allsvenskan players
Hammarby Fotboll players
Hammarby Talang FF players